Codex Omega is the tenth studio album by Greek death metal band Septicflesh, released on September 1, 2017, through Season of Mist.

Track listing
All lyrics written by Sotiris V., all music composed by Septicflesh.

Personnel
Septicflesh
 Christos Antoniou – lead guitar, orchestrations
 Sotiris Anunnaki V – rhythm guitar, clean vocals
 Seth Siro Anton – bass, unclean vocals, artwork
 Kerim "Krimh" Lechner – drums, percussion

Charts

References

2017 albums
Septicflesh albums
Season of Mist albums
Prosthetic Records albums
Albums produced by Jens Bogren
Albums by Greek artists